Patricia Mauladi (born 22 January 1996) is a Zimbabwean netball player who represents Zimbabwe internationally and plays in the positions of wing attack and wing defense. She was a member of the Zimbabwean squad which finished at eighth position during the 2019 Netball World Cup, which was historically Zimbabwe's first ever appearance at a Netball World Cup tournament.

References 

1996 births
Living people
Zimbabwean netball players
2019 Netball World Cup players
20th-century Zimbabwean women
21st-century Zimbabwean women